Symphony Concertante is a composition by Gail Kubik (1914–1984) for trumpet, viola, piano, and orchestra. It was premiered January 7, 1952 by its commissioner, The Little Orchestra, Thomas Scherman conducting.

The work is structured as follows:
Fast, vigorously
Quietly
Fast, with energy.

Kubik was awarded the Pulitzer Prize for Music in 1952 for the piece. The committee wrote: "The Symphony Concertante is brilliant and exuberant, full of rhythmic vitality, the orchestration both original and skillful." The piece is based on his score for C-Man.

Sources

Compositions by Gail Kubik
1952 compositions
Kubik
Pulitzer Prize for Music-winning works